HaSeul (or LOOΠΔ & HaSeul) is the third single album from South Korean girl group Loona's pre-debut project. It was released on December 15, 2016, by Blockberry Creative and distributed by CJ E&M. It introduces member HaSeul and contains two tracks, her solo "Let Me In", and a Christmas collaboration song between her, HeeJin and HyunJin, titled "The Carol". Music Videos for both songs were released simultaneously on December 15.

Track listing

Charts

References

2016 singles
Loona (group) albums
Single albums
Blockberry Creative singles